Norman Barron (15 May 1899 – 25 September 1987) was an Australian rules footballer who played with Sturt in the South Australian National Football League (SANFL).

Football
Barron missed the 1929 season when he was appointed playing coach of Victorian club Warracknabeal in the Wimmera Football League.

He returned to Sturt when he was not reappointed following Warracknabeal's failure to make the finals in his only season as coach.

See also
 1927 Melbourne Carnival

Footnotes

External links 
Norman Barron's profile at AustralianFootball.com	

1899 births
1987 deaths
Sturt Football Club players
Australian rules footballers from South Australia
Warracknabeal Football Club players
Wimmera Football League players